Central Jail Lahore is a prominent prison situated in Lahore, Punjab, Pakistan at Rakh Chandra (Kot Lakhpat). The prison is also known as Kot Lakhpat Jail with reference to its location. The jail houses more than four times the 4000 prisoner capacity it was built for. Some prisoners died in the prison in the past, including Indian prisoner Sarabjit Singh, who was convicted of terrorism.

See also
 Government of Punjab, Pakistan
 Punjab Prisons (Pakistan)
 Central Jail Faisalabad
 Central Jail Mianwali
 Headquarter Jail
 Central Jail Rawalpindi
 District Jail Rawalpindi
 National Academy for Prisons Administration

References 

Prisons in Pakistan